Who Killed Johnny is a Swiss-American screwball comedy film by Yangzom Brauen, filmed and produced in Los Angeles in 2013.

Plot 
In the first scene of the film, Melanie is at six in the morning brewing Espresso in her kitchen; a scene that will be repeated several times. Her alleged boyfriend tries quietly to come in the house,  there is a dispute because of his infidelity, and Melanie is stabbed by Carlos in the kitchen.

Melanie (Melanie Winiger) lives in Los Angeles and tried with her childhood friend Alex (Max Loong) who also grew up in Zürich in Switzerland, to write the screenplay for a movie in her living room. Both Swiss live in Los Angeles, as actress and actors unknown in their new home, but full of dreams and ambitions in the movie business. They seem to agree only about the planned movie's opening scene in the kitchen, and the male actor Carlos; but not about the further story, whether there should be a comedy, tragedy, a horror movie or thriller. Throughout the day, they muse about the script, fooling around, interrupted by two of their neighbours, Jambo (Ernest Allan Hausmann) and his girlfriend Gudrun (Jordan Carver), who like to enjoy themselves in Melanie's pool in the garden. Alex is watching fascinated the hustle and bustle of the two, in particular of Gudrun in the pool during a work break, developing the screenplay in thoughts, as Melanie in the living room, where she thinks about it, the protagonists of the film to make their quirky friends in Los Angeles, also originating in Switzerland. Both unaware that the brownies from Jambo were not intended for the hosts, as they included hashish and tremendously stimulate, they show fantasies of Alex and Melanie in the movie, who had consumed wine before ...

In a later scene, the quartet discovers from the balcony a man lying at the bottom of the street, and seems to the victim of a car accident. Jambo wants to help, Melanie denies to avoid problems with the police, as they are foreigners in the United States; Gudrun and Jambo come from Germany, Jambo is illegal in the United States, and three of them are also colored people, as Melanie sets them apart after Jambo brought the supposedly dead in Melanie's apartment. Now in panic, they think about how 'to rid of the dead'. Before they can implement that idea, they notice that the dead man is undoubtedly Johnny Depp ...

The quartet misuse the 'godsend' amateurish, to integrate the supposed star in snippets of their film: love scenes with Gudrun and Melanie, a scene inspired with Melanie in a car inspired by Fear and Loathing in Las Vegas etc. They are interrupted by a self-claimed policeman who inquires on the doorstep to witness a probable hit-and-run and the remains of the victim, Alex' hash dealer, and Hasso and friend which each unannounced bursts in the apartment. Melanie would like to the dead 'get rid of' and Alex knows a cleaner, which takes the supposed corpse out of the house. In a very short scene, the plastic bag used for that suppose moves, and the non-visible cleaner (but being the police officer) "You had to be dead" says and hits with a stick on his victim.

Three months later the first scene of the film is taken finally: Alex (Director), Jambo (sound), Yangzom Brauen and two other friends for camera, script and mask, and Melanie (writer, cover). Gudrun acts as the lead actress and Carlos Leal as Marcel in the male lead role. Because Carlos is concerned about his motivation and especially the unpleasant role as villain, as he claims, the production is delayed more and more, and growing disputes between him as 'professional' and Gudrun as 'amateur', so he shouts, thus the eighth take ends in a disaster – Alex is excited about the setting, but now the movie team now notices that Gudrun actually is stabbed by Marcel in effect.

In the final scene of the film, the fictional Swiss television channel CH1 reports in its newscast, that Carlos Leal, actor and former member of Sens Unik,  has been arrested in Los Angeles for manslaughter, as well as Melanie Winiger and Alex Loong are suspected to be enrolled in a pre-trial detention. A possible link is mentioned with a look-alike of Johnny Depp, found death three months ago.

Cast 
 Melanie Winiger as Melanie
 Max Loong as Max
 Carlos Leal as Marcel and Carlos
 Ernest Hausmann as Jambo
 Jordan Carver as Gudrun
 Tim Talbot as Simon
 Trevor Coppola as Wulf
 Gerold Wunstel as Hasso
 Yangzom Brauen as bar tender and filmcrew
 Ronnie Rodriguez as Look-alike of Johnny Depp 
Rest of cast listed alphabetically: 
 Nadine Bosurgi as Miriam 
 Florine Elena Deplazes as Penelope
 Martina Harrer as Hairdresser client 
 Melina Hess as Make-up girl
 Christopher Karl Johnson as Police officer, Cleaner
 Marcus Maria Jung as Cameraman
 Garo Kuyumcuovic as Businessman
 Barbara Lamelza as Woman at the bar 
 Tomm Luna as Assistant hairdresser 
 Melissa Macri as Guest 1 
 David Lee McInnis as Max 2 
 Lexy Stork as Lili (as Lexy Rapsomanikis) 
 Jade Thompson as Guest 2 
 Roman Wyden as Newscaster

Production 
Produced and collaborated on the comedy have Swiss people living in the United States. The independent film was shot during eight days at the home of Yangzom Brauen. A part of the film's budget was collected using crowdfunding. Who Killed Johnny is an independent feature film, shot with an international crew and cast in the house of Yangzom Brauen in the Hollywood hills. Funding was provided by the personal support of the crew and cast, private investors and Kickstarter as fundraising platform. The entire crew has helped even when hanging up movie posters and waived fees.

Background 
The Swiss actor and writer Yanghom Brauen debuted as director. The script for the screwball comedy was written with the co-writer and actor Gerild Wunsterl. They intended to give an inside view on struggling artists and writers, their instincts to survive in the movie business and their ambitions to make a 'hit' in Hollywood despite all odds. While casting, Yangzom Brauen and Shari Yantra Marcacci (producer) found an 'eye catcher' being Jordan Carver making her screen debut with Swiss award winning actress Melanie Winiger, Max Loong and Carlos Leal. The premiere in Zürich was a factored flop: Swiss movies have it just hard when the home crowd, and the simultaneously held Zürifäscht and the high-summer weather, tolf zhr film distributor Jonas Frei of the Swiss distributor Moviebiz to the media. The director Yangzom Brauen did otherwise expect the flop. I am proud that we were in the cinemas ... a sequel is already planned ... only dependent on the funding.»

Release 
The Swiss comedy celebrated their premiere on 13 February 2013 in Los Angeles, where the audience responded very positively; and on 4 July 2013 in the Swiss cinemas: just 600 spectators, of which 300 were premiere guests, visited the cinema release in Zurich. Broadcast on television was carried out for the first time on 5 and 9 December 2013 on the Swiss private channel S1.

International film festivals 
In 2013 Who Killed Jonny was aired and awarded at international six film festivals, among them the Chicago Comedy Festival, Colortape International Film Festival, Costa Rica International Film Festival, FF2 International Film Festival, Hoboken International Film Festival and the Trinidad International Film Festival, where it get very positive response.

Reception 

Although the film flopped in the German-language cinemas, he received mostly positive reviews, and was aired on five US film festivals:

Home media 
The film was released on DVD in German (FSK 12) and English language.

Accolades 
 2013 Chicago Comedy Festival: Best screenplay, winner
 2013 Colortape International Film Festival: Best director, nomination
 2013 Costa Rica International Film Festival: Best comedy/feature, winner
 2013 FF2 International Film Festival: Official selection
 2013 Hoboken International Film Festival: Best actress, nomination for Melanie Winiger 
 2013 Trinidad International Film Festival: Best comedy feature, winner

See also 
 Guerrilla filmmaking
 Swiss diaspora

References

External links 
 
 

2013 films
Swiss German-language films
2010s crime comedy films
2013 independent films
American independent films
Films shot in Los Angeles
Films about filmmaking
Swiss independent films
2010s screwball comedy films
2013 comedy films
2013 directorial debut films
2010s American films